The Vienna Ab initio Simulation Package, better known as VASP, is a package for performing ab initio quantum mechanical calculations using either Vanderbilt pseudopotentials, or the projector augmented wave method, and a plane wave basis set.  The basic methodology is density functional theory (DFT), but the code also allows use of post-DFT corrections such as hybrid functionals mixing DFT and Hartree–Fock exchange (e.g. HSE, PBE0 or B3LYP), many-body perturbation theory (the GW method) and dynamical electronic correlations within the random phase approximation (RPA) and MP2.

Originally, VASP was based on code written by Mike Payne (then at MIT), which was also the basis of CASTEP. It was then brought to the University of Vienna, Austria, in July 1989 by Jürgen Hafner. The main program was written by Jürgen Furthmüller, who joined the group at the Institut für Materialphysik in January 1993, and Georg Kresse. VASP is currently being developed by Georg Kresse; recent additions include the extension of methods frequently used in molecular quantum chemistry to periodic systems. 
VASP is currently used by more than 1400 research groups in academia and industry worldwide on the basis of software licence agreements with the University of Vienna.

The latest version VASP.6.3.2 was released on 28 June 2022.

See also 
 Quantum chemistry computer programs

References

External links
http://www.vasp.at/

Computational chemistry software
Computational physics
Density functional theory software
Physics software